The Roman Catholic Diocese of Byumba is an ecclesiastical territory or diocese of the Roman Catholic Church in Rwanda. It was erected on November 5, 1981, by Pope John Paul II. The diocese is a suffragan of the Archdiocese of Kigali.

List of bishops of Byumba
Joseph Ruzindana (1981-1994)
Servilien Nzakamwita (1996–2022)
Papias Musengamana  (2022–present)

References

External links
Catholic-Hierarchy 
GCatholic.org 

Byumba
Butare
Roman Catholic dioceses and prelatures established in the 20th century